The 7th Directors Guild of America Awards, honoring the outstanding directorial achievements in film and television in 1954, were presented in 1955.

Winners and nominees

Film

Television

Honorary Life Member
 Walt Disney

External links
 

Directors Guild of America Awards
1954 film awards
1954 television awards
Direct
Direct
1954 awards in the United States